Business Register System (abbreviated URS) is a statistical business register in Germany which provides structural data about economic sectors and serves as the essential source of information about entities which is needed for planning, preparation and implementation of statistical surveys.

Legal basis 

Business Register System 95 (URS 95) operates according to EU Regulation (EEC European Economic Community) No 2186/93 on Community
coordination in drawing up business registers for statistical purposes.

URS also has a national legal basis: Statistical Register Law – StatRegG of 16 June 1998.

URS Neu, newer register system operates according to the newer version of regulation No 177/2008 establishing a common framework for business registers for statistical purposes.

References 

Economic databases